Andrey Andreevich Guryev Jr. is a Russian businessman. He is the son of Andrey Guryev, a Russian oligarch. Guryev Jr. took over PhosAgro, his father's company. The Guryev family owns nearly 50% of the company.

His father built the company up in during the 1990s following the collapse of the Soviet Union. It is one of the four largest producers of phosphate-based fertilizers in the world.

Guryev Jr. was added to the European Sanctions list as of 9 March 2022 for providing a substantial source of revenue to the government of the Russian Federation.

Biography
He is the son of Andrey Guryev and Evgenia. In May 2015, Forbes estimated his father's net worth at US$3.8 billion.

In 2011, the Guryev family owned 71% of PhosAgro, with 10% owned by Vladimir Litvinenko. The family owned nearly 50% in 2017.

Personal life
He is married to Valeria, who was educated at the London College of Fashion.

References

Living people
Russian chief executives
Russian businesspeople in the United Kingdom
Russian individuals subject to European Union sanctions
1982 births